David Aaron Baker (born August 14, 1963) is an American actor whose credits stretch across theater, film, television and audiobooks.

Biography
On Broadway, he is most prominently known for his starring role as "Prince Dauntless" opposite Sarah Jessica Parker in the 1996 Tony nominated revival of Once Upon a Mattress. He subsequently appeared in the 2004 revival of Lorraine Hansberry's A Raisin in the Sun, opposite Phylicia Rashad, Audra McDonald, Sanaa Lathan, and Sean Combs.

Baker performed as Jimmy Curry in New York City Opera's 1992 production of 110 in the Shade at Lincoln Center's New York State Theater, and then in 2018 appeared on the same stage in New York City Ballet's Jerome Robbins 100 Festival playing the MajorDomo in Fanfare (ballet).

On film, he has appeared in Woody Allen’s Melinda and Melinda. He is the voice of Dean Koontz's Odd Thomas on audio book. He voices a role in QCode’s fiction series podcast Listening In starring Rachel Brosnahan.

Filmography 
 Sex and the City (1998) as Ted in Season 1, Episode 6: "Secret Sex"
 The Tao of Steve (2000) as Rick
 The Music Man (2003) as Marcellus
 Criminal Minds (2005) as Will Sykes in Season 1, Episode 17: "A Real Rain"
 Once More with Feeling (2009) as Rich
 Blue Bloods (2010) as Father Leo in Season 1, Episodes 6: "Smack Attack"
 Boardwalk Empire (2010–2011) as Bill Fallon in 6 episodes 
 And So It Goes (2014) as David Shaw
 The Purge: Election Year (2016), as NFFA Press Secretary Tommy Roseland
 Boarding School (2018) as Davis Rathbone
 The Society (2019) as Jim Pressman in Season 1, Episode 1: "What Happened"

References

External links 

http://www.tv.com/people/david-aaron-baker/
https://www.audible.com/DavidAaronBaker
https://davidaaronbaker.com/

American male stage actors
Living people
1963 births
21st-century American male actors
Male actors from Durham, North Carolina
American male television actors
American male film actors
20th-century American male actors